Adam Bellow is executive editor at Bombardier Books, a politically conservative imprint at Post Hill Press. He previously founded and led the conservative imprints All Points Books at St Martin's Press and Broadside Books at HarperCollins, served as executive editor-at-large at Doubleday, and as editorial director at Free Press, publishing several controversial conservative books such as Illiberal Education, The Real Anita Hill, The Bell Curve, and Clinton Cash.

He is the publisher of The New Pamphleteer, co-editor of The State of the American Mind, and the author of In Praise of Nepotism.

Bellow is the son of novelist Saul Bellow.

Works
"My Escape From The Zabar's Left". New York, May 21, 2005

References

External links 
 "An Interview with Adam Bellow", Family Business Experts
 "Adam Bellow, Pamphleteer for the 21st Century", Columbia Journalism Review, December 20, 2006
 "Adam Bellow -- publisher, editor, author", Conservations in the Book Trade, January 08, 2009
"'Blinded by the Right': An Exchange", The New York Review of Books, October 10, 2002
"Jonah Goldberg, Call Your Publisher", The New Republic, Jonathan Chait, July 11, 2008

Living people
American book editors
American people of Lithuanian-Jewish descent
Naval War College Review people
Year of birth missing (living people)